The 1979 Ole Miss Rebels football team represented the University of Mississippi as a member of the Southeastern Conference (SEC) during the 1979 NCAA Division I-A football season. Led by second-year head coach Steve Sloan, the Rebels compiled an overall record of 4–7 with a mark of 3–3 in conference play, placing in a three-way tie for fifth in the SEC. Ole Miss played home games at  Hemingway Stadium in Oxford, Mississippi and Mississippi Veterans Memorial Stadium in Jackson, Mississippi.

Schedule

Roster

Season summary

Mississippi State

    
    
    
    

MISS: John Fourcade 11/17, 143 Yds, 9 Rush, 40 Yds (second player in school history with 2,000 yards total offense in single season – A. Manning, 1969)

References

Ole Miss
Ole Miss Rebels football seasons
Ole Miss Rebels football